Jay Prakash College, Narayanpur, also known as J.P. College,  established in 1952, is a general degree college at Narayanpur, in Bhagalpur district, Bihar. It is a constituent college of Tilka Manjhi Bhagalpur University, and offers undergraduate courses in science, arts and commerce.

References

Colleges affiliated to Tilka Manjhi Bhagalpur University
Education in Bhagalpur district
Educational institutions established in 1952
Universities and colleges in Bihar
1952 establishments in Bihar